Amyema benthamii, commonly known as the twin-leaved mistletoe or Bentham's mistletoe, is a species of flowering plant, an epiphytic hemiparasitic plant of the family Loranthaceae native to Western Australia and the Northern Territory of Australia in semi-arid woodland. This species is named in honour of the English botanist George Bentham who between 1863 and 1878 published Flora Australiensis, the first flora of Australia.

Description
The flowers, which have reddish-brown stalks, are borne in the axils of the leaves in dangling groups of three; the buds are reddish-purple with green bases and tips, and open to reveal pale green petals and a projecting boss of stamens. It has a sparse, open habit of growth.

Taxonomy 
The species was first described in  1922 as Loranthus benthamii by William Blakely,  but was reassigned to the genus, Amyema, by Benedictus Hubertus Danser in 1929.

Ecology
A. benthamii has been recorded as growing on thirty-one different species of host plant from eighteen different plant families. The most frequently used host is the bottletree (Brachychiton spp.), but other common hosts include Owenia and Acacia.

References

benthamii
Eudicots of Western Australia
Flora of the Northern Territory
Parasitic plants
Epiphytes
Taxa named by William Blakely
Plants described in 1922